Center Township is one of eight townships in Vanderburgh County, Indiana, United States.  As of the 2010 census, its population was 39,007 and it contained 16,306 housing units.

Center Township was organized in 1843.

History
The Hooker-Ensle-Pierce House, McJohnston Chapel and Cemetery, and Charles Sweeton House are listed on the National Register of Historic Places.

Geography

Cities and towns
 Darmstadt (south edge)
 Evansville (north portion)
 Highland (CDP)
 Melody Hill (CDP)

Unincorporated towns
 Country Club Meadows
 Erskine Station
 Harwood
 Knob Hill
 Kratzville
 Lakewood Hills
 McCutchanville
 Mechanicsville

Adjacent townships
 Vanderburgh County
 Scott Township (north)
 Knight Township (southeast)
 Perry Township (southwest)
 Pigeon Township (southwest)
 German Township (west)
 Warrick County
 Campbell Township (east)

Cemeteries
The township contains these eight cemeteries: Bethlehem, Campground, Locust Hill, Mount Carmel, Oak Ridge, Rose Hill, Saint Peters and Sunset Memorial Gardens.

Airports and landing strips
 Evansville Dress Regional Airport
 Skylane Airport

School district history

As Center Township is part of Vanderburgh County, all students attend schools in the Evansville-Vanderburgh School Corporation.

Center Township Schools, late 1800s
 #1: Stringtown School: NW c. Stringtown & Mill Rds. 
 #2: Mt. Pleasant School: NW c. Mt. Pleasant & Old State Rds. (consolidated into Highland School 1923)
 #3: McCutchanville School: c. Whetstone & Petersburg Rds. (consolidated into Oak Hill School, 1966, re-purposed). 
 #4: Lynch School: c. of Oak Hill & Lynch Rds. (consolidated into Oak Hill School, 1957, re-purposed)
 #5: Highland School: NE c. Kratzville & Darmstadt Rd./First Ave. 
 #6: Union School: Darmstadt Rd. opposite Mohr Rd. (consolidated into Highland School, 1923)
 #7: Hooker School: NW c. Oak Hill & Whetstone Rds. (consolidated into McCutchanville School, 1918)
 #8 Kansas: NE c. Kansas & Green River Rds. (consolidated into McCutchanville School, 1918) 
 #9 Hornby/Erskine Station: NE c. Petersburg Rd. and US 41 (consolidated into McCutchanville School, 1918)
 #10 Kratzville: NW c. Kratzville & Mill Rds. (consolidated into Highland School, 1923)
 #11 Harwood/First Ave.: First Ave. N of Lohoff (consolidated into Cedar Hall School, 2011, re-purposed)

In 1918 and 1923, some township schools were consolidated into McCutchanville and Highland Schools, respectively (Lynch and Stringtown Schools remained open). In 1957, Lynch School was consolidated into the new Oak Hill School (grades K-5 only), with McCutchanville School being consolidated into Oak Hill School and closed in 1966 when the grade 6-8 addition to Oak Hill was finished. Central High School moved from downtown Evansville to northern First Avenue/Darmstadt Road in 1973. 1984's reorganization changed a K-8 system into a K-5/6-8 system, while 2011 gave students the relocation of North High School and construction of North Junior High School far north of the city of Evansville, at the intersection of US 41 and Inglefield Rd. (Scott Township). Currently, Stringtown and Highland Elementary Schools (K-5) feed into Thompkins Middle School (6-8), and Harwood district's students attend Cedar Hall School (K-8), with all attending Central High School. East of US 41, students now attend Oak Hill, Vogel or Scott Elementary (K-6), then North Junior High School and North High School.

Political districts
 Indiana's 8th congressional district
 State House District 75
 State House District 78
 State Senate District 49
 State Senate District 50

References
 
 United States Census Bureau 2007 TIGER/Line Shapefiles
 IndianaMap

External links

Townships in Vanderburgh County, Indiana
Townships in Indiana